Gooder is a surname. Notable people with the surname include:

Frederick John Gooder (1862–1948), New Zealand cricketer
Grace Gooder (1924–1983), New Zealand cricketer
Paula Gooder (born 1969), English Theologian

See also
Gooden
Goodey